Miena may refer to:

Miena, Tasmania
Miena, Mali